The Main Frame was a dark wave band from Long Beach, California formed in 2001 by Steve Krolikowski (vocals and guitar), Rob Wallace (keyboard), Bill “Dungs” Roman (bass) and Vaughn Klemz (drums). Vaughn Klemz was replaced by Trip Waterhouse in 2003. The band dissolved in 2005. Krolikowski continued playing with Wallace and eventually formed the band Repeater.  Krolikowski also joined Korn's Munky-led supergroup, Fear and the Nervous System.

Recordings 

The Main Frame recorded one full-length album Curse of Evolution (2003) and several unreleased EPs. 

"Beat To Death" and "Weak Exit" are two songs from the band's 2004 unreleased EP that appear on IFC Films' American Gun.

Discography
Studio Albums
Curse of Evolution (2003)

EPs
Skull EP (2002)
Beat To Death EP (2004)

Reviews
"Haunting, stark pop that stands out, and relatively alone in the oft-flashy LA music scene" OC Weekly

"Synthesizer driven sophistication with undeniably dark undertones" Tangerine Magazine

External links 
The Main Frame on purevolume.com

References

American post-punk music groups
Culture of Long Beach, California
Indie rock musical groups from California
Musical groups established in 2005
Post-punk revival music groups